This is a list of film studios and film production companies in the Philippines from 1919 up to the present.

 3 Star Pictures
 Above-the-line Productions 
 A.C.C.S. Film Productions (Avanguard Creatives) 
 Acuña-Zaldariaga 
 A.G.P Film Production
 A.L.B. Production
 A.M. Production 
 APT Entertainment
 A. R. Production (Armando Rodriguez Production)
 A.V.P. Production
 AgostoDos Pictures
 Agrix Film
 Al Martin Pictures
 Aliud Productions
 Amaritz Productions 
 Ambassador Picture
 Americo-Filipino
 Angora Films
 Associated Artists
 Associated Theaters
 Atic Inc. 
 ATB 5
 Athena Productions
 Artikulo Uno Productions
 Avellana and Company
 BAS Film Productions Inc.
 Banahaw Pictures 
 Balatbat Productions
 Bonanza Productions
 Bancom Audiovision
 Bayani
 Bayanihan Pictures
 Bigfoot Studios 
 Binatang Parang Films
 Black Sheep Productions
 Broadway Production
 Buchi Boy Entertainment
 ByTheSea Philippines
 Camia Production
 Carlos Vander Tolosa Production
 Cervatina Filipina
 Cineko Productions
 CineMedia
 Cinex Films Inc.
 Cine Suerte
 Corazon Roque Production
 Curve Entertainment
 D'Lanor Picture
 Dalisay Picture
 Davian International Ltd.
 DES Production
 DIGITANK Studios
 Diosa Production
 Diwata Films
 Dulaney Film Productions
 Eduque Production 
 Eastern Pictures
 E.K. Films
 El Niño Films
 Emar Picture
 Estrella & Co.,
 Excelsior Films
 Everlasting Pictures, Inc
 Everybody's Production
 Experimental Cinema of the Philippines
 Exploration Pictures Corp.
 FPJ Productions
 Filcudoma
 Filipinas Picture
 Filippine Productions
 Film Entertainment Exponent
 F. Puzon Film Enterprises Inc.
 GAMA Studios 
 G.M. Picture
 GMA Films
 Globe Studios
 Good Harvest Promotion
 Gretas Production
 Hemisphere Picture
 Hollywood Far-East
 Ilonggo Productions
 Imus Productions
 Jafere Production
 J.E. Production
 JBC Film Production
 Jela Productions
 Joaquin Film Company 
 John-John Films Production
 Jose Nepomuceno Productions
 Karilagan Production
 Kayumanggi Cinema Inc.
 Kinavesa International
 Kislap-Tagalog Picture
 King Abalos Films
 K Productions (formerly Kris Aquino Productions)
 Larry Santiago Production
 Lawin
 Lea Productions
 Lebran Productions
 Libran Motion Picture
 Liliw Productions
 Liwayway Films 
 LL Production
 LSJ Production
 Luis F. Nolasco Production
 Luzon Motion Pictures 
 Luz V. Minda
 LVN Pictures
 M.B.M. Film Production
 Mabuhay Cinema
 Magna East Production
 Malayan Movies
 Malayan Pictures Corporation
 Manansala Films 
 Manila Talkatone
 MC Production 
 McLaurin Bros.
 MEDA Productions
 Milagrosa
 MM Production
 Monserrat Enterprises 
 Motion Picture Casting Corporation
 Moviestars
 Movietec
 M - Zet TV Productions, Inc.
 N²
 Neo Film
 Nepomuceno Productions
 Nolasco Bros.
 Novastar
 N.V. Production
 OctoArts Films
 Oriental Moving Picture
 Oriental Pictures
 Palaris Pictures
 Panay Negros Productions
 Pangilinan Productions
 Paragon Pictures
 Parlatone Hispano Filipino
 Pauline's Production
 Pedro Vera Pictures
 People's Picture
 Philartech Productions
 Philippine National Pictures
 Philippines Artist Guild
 Philippine Paradise Pictures
 Poe-Zshornack Production
 Premiere Productions
 Quantum Films
 Red Epic Production
 RDR Productions 
 Regal Entertainment, Inc.
 Rizalina Film Manufacturing Company
 Rosas Production
 Royal Film
 R.T.G. Production
 RV Production
 RVQ Productions
 Sampaguita Pictures
 San Francisco del Monte Pictures
 Sanggumay Pictures
 Seiko Films
 Sine Screen
 Skylight Films
 Silver Star Film Company
 Sotang Bastos Production
 Solar Films International
 Sta.Maria
 Spring Films
 Star Cinema
 Supreme
 SVS Pictures
 Studio 5
 Tagalog Ilang-Ilang Production
 Tamaraw Picture
 TBA Studios
 Teamwork Productions
 Ten17P
 The IdeaFirst Company
 TINCAN
 Topaz Production
 Tuko Film Productions
 T-Rex Entertainment
 United Philippine Artists
 Universal Pictures
 Vera-Perez Productions
 Virgo Productions
 Vision Film
 Vitri Film
 V Rich Films International
 Viva Films
 Violett Films
 V.S. Film
 Wack-Wack Pictures
 Waling-Waling
 Wild World Entertainment
 X'Otic Films
 Zultana International
 Studio Cuento

References